Helir-Valdor Seeder (born 7 September 1964) is an Estonian politician. He is a member of the parliament, current chairman of the Isamaa and served as Minister of Agriculture from 2007 to 2014. Seeder has a master's degree in economics from the Estonian University of Life Sciences. 

On 13 May 2017 Seeder was elected the chairman of the Pro Patria and Res Publica Union (later renamed Isamaa).

References

1964 births
21st-century Estonian politicians
Agriculture ministers of Estonia
Estonian University of Life Sciences alumni
Government ministers of Estonia
Isamaa politicians
Living people
Mayors of places in Estonia
Members of the Riigikogu, 2003–2007
Members of the Riigikogu, 2007–2011
Members of the Riigikogu, 2011–2015
Members of the Riigikogu, 2015–2019
Members of the Riigikogu, 2019–2023
Members of the Riigikogu, 2023–2027
People from Viljandi
Recipients of the Order of the White Star, 3rd Class